Alexander Jun is an American academic and Presbyterian official. He is a professor of Higher Education at Azusa Pacific University, and former moderator of the Presbyterian Church in America. He was also the first-place winner of the 2020 Korean American ROAR Story Slam in Los Angeles, CA.

Early life
Jun graduated from the University of Southern California with a bachelor's degree. He subsequently earned a master's degree from California State University, Los Angeles, and a PhD from the University of Southern California.

Career
Jun was a faculty member at the University of Southern California for 15 years. He later joined Azusa Pacific University, where he became professor of Higher Education. He is the author of a book about Latinos in higher education, and the co-author of a second book about white privilege.

Jun was elected as the moderator of the Presbyterian Church in America in June 2017.

Works

References

Living people
University of Southern California alumni
California State University, Los Angeles alumni
University of Southern California faculty
Azusa Pacific University faculty
Presbyterian Church in America members
Year of birth missing (living people)